Rock Branch is an unincorporated community in Elbert County, in the U.S. state of Georgia.

History
The community takes its name from nearby Rock Branch creek.

References

Unincorporated communities in Elbert County, Georgia
Unincorporated communities in Georgia (U.S. state)